Paulo Henrique Souza de Oliveira Filho (18 August 1964 — 13 February 2017), known as Paulo Henrique Filho or just Paulo Henrique, was a Brazilian football player and coach. He played as a forward mainly on the left side of the pitch, and was known for his association with Flamengo.

Paulo Henrique's father Paulo Henrique Souza de Oliveira and his son Henrique Lordelo also played professionally.

Honours

Player 
 Flamengo
 Taça Rio: 1985

Manager 
 Flamengo
 Copa São Paulo de Futebol Júnior: 2011
 Torneio Octávio Pinto Guimarães: 2011

References

External links

1964 births
2017 deaths
Brazilian footballers
Brazilian football managers
Expatriate footballers in Portugal
Campeonato Brasileiro Série A players
Primeira Liga players
CR Flamengo footballers
Olaria Atlético Clube players
America Football Club (RJ) players
S.C. Braga players
F.C. Penafiel players
Club Puebla players
Avaí FC players
Linhares Esporte Clube players
Macaé Esporte Futebol Clube managers
Association football forwards
Footballers from Rio de Janeiro (city)